Bernardo Cavallino (1616–1656) was an Italian painter and draughtsman. He is regarded as one of the most original painters active in Naples during the first half of the 17th century.

Biography
Born in Naples, he is thought to have died during the plague epidemic in 1656. While his paintings are some of the more stunningly expressive works emerging from the Neapolitan artists of his day, little is known about the painter's background or training. Of eighty attributed paintings, less than ten are signed. He worked through private dealers and collectors whose records are no longer available.

It is said that he trained with Massimo Stanzione, befriended the painter Andrea Vaccaro, and was influenced by Anthony van Dyck, but his paintings could also be described as equidistant from Caravaggio and Bartolomé Esteban Murillo in styles; tenebrism enveloped with a theatrical sweetness, a posed ecstasy and feeling characteristic of the high Roman baroque statuary. He is known to have worked in Neapolitan circles strongly influenced by Stanzione, which included Antonio de Bellis, Artemisia Gentileschi, Francesco Francanzano, Agostino Beltrano and Francesco Guarino.

One of his masterpieces is the billowing proletarian Blessed Virgin at the Brera Gallery in Milan. Passive amid the swirling, muscular putti, this Neapolitan signorina delicately rises from the fog, the updated Catholic baroque equivalent of a Botticelli's Venus. His The Ecstasy of St Cecilia exists both as cartoon (Museo di Capodimonte, Naples) and final copy in the Palazzo Vecchio of Florence. Finally, his Esther and Ahasuerus hangs in the Uffizi Gallery.

Works

Immaculate Conception (1640), 69 cm x 45 cm, Musée des Beaux-Arts, Caen
Immaculate Conception (1650), Brera Gallery, Milan
The Ecstasy of Saint Cecilia, cartoon, Museo di Capodimonte, Naples
The Ecstasy of Saint Cecilia, final work, Palazzo Vecchio, Florence
Esther and Ahasuerus, Uffizi Gallery, Florence
Adoration of the Magi
Gaius Mucius Scaevola Confronting King Porsenna
Saint John the Baptist
Clavicord Player
Hercules and Omphale
Adoration of the Shepherds
The Vision of Saint Dominic
Lot and his Daughters
Virgin Annunciate (c. 1645–50), 85.5 cm x 70.0 cm, National Gallery of Victoria, Melbourne, Australia
Woman Playing the Clavichord

References

Further reading 

 On Seicento Painting in Naples: Some Observations on Bernardo Cavallino, Artemisia Gentileschi and Others, Józef Grabski. (1985) Artibus et Historiae. p. 23-63.

External links

 Museum biography
Orazio and Artemisia Gentileschi, a fully digitized exhibition catalog from The Metropolitan Museum of Art Libraries, which contains material on Bernardo Cavallino (see index)

1616 births
1656 deaths
17th-century Italian painters
Italian male painters
Italian Baroque painters
Painters from Naples